Aqanj (also Romanized as Āqanj, Āqenj, and Āqonj; also known as Āghonj, Aghanj, and Aghunj) is a village in Sarjam Rural District, Ahmadabad District, Mashhad County, Razavi Khorasan Province, Iran. At the 2006 census, its population was 69, in 18 families.

See also 

 List of cities, towns and villages in Razavi Khorasan Province

References 

Populated places in Mashhad County